Angelo Simone (born 19 December 1986 in Genk) is a former Belgian professional footballer who plays as a midfielder for RKVV DESO. He formerly played for Fortuna Sittard and FC Oss.

References

Versterking voor VVA'71, rtvutrecht.nl, 13 January 2014
Angelo Simone op proef bij DESO, indewandelgangen.com, 28 January 2014
ANGELO SIMONE KEERT TERUG IN OSS, FC Oss
RKVV Deso squad

External links
 Voetbal International profile 
 

1986 births
Living people
Belgian footballers
Fortuna Sittard players
TOP Oss players
Eerste Divisie players
Sportspeople from Genk
Footballers from Limburg (Belgium)
Association football midfielders